Georgie Sterling was an Australian actress, noted for her work in radio and television, especially in TV films and serials, although she also appeared in theatre.  
She started her career in the late 1950s and appeared in a TV movie version of Hamlet. In serials she played Isabella Drysdale in the ill-fated series Taurus Rising but is possibly best known for her role as May Walters in Sons and Daughters. She also appeared in Homicide, Matlock Police and A Country Practice. She was married to fellow actor and radio producer John Saul.

Selected filmography

External links
 
Georgie Sterling at National Film and Sound Archive
George Sterling theatre credits at Ausstage

Australian television actresses